Nadan Pennum Natupramaniyum is a 2000 Indian Malayalam-language action drama film directed by Rajasenan and written by Suresh Poduval from a story by Rajasenan and Mahesh Mithra. The film stars Jayaram, Samyuktha Varma, Srividya and Jagathy Sreekumar. The film features music composed by A. B. Murali. The plot revolves around Govindan, a ruthless jewelry shop owner, and Gayathri, an employee in his store.

Plot

Govindan, a ruthless businessman, is willing to go to any extent to make money. However, his life takes a drastic turn when Gayathri enters his life.

Cast
Jayaram as Govindan
Samyuktha Varma as Gayathri Namboothiri
Jagathy Sreekumar as Unni Pillai
Srividya as Govindan's mother
KPAC Lalitha as Thankamani
Kottayam Nazeer as Veeramani, Thankamani's son
Harishree Ashokan as Pappan
Indrans as Ganeshan
Kalamandalam Kesavan as Vishnu Narayanan Namboothiri, Gayathri's father 
N. F. Varghese as Bheeran
Abu Salim as Selvam
Chali Pala as Thomas
T. P. Madhavan as Madhavan
Vinu Chakravarthy as Pichadi Perumal
Jose Pellissery as Kuriakose
Jayakumar Parameswaran Pillai
Salim Kumar as Showroom Manager 
Sona Nair
Payyans Jayakumar as Nandan

Soundtrack
The music was composed by A. B. Murali.

References

External links
 

2000 films
2000s Malayalam-language films
Films directed by Rajasenan